Rhynchoedura is a genus of lizards in the family Diplodactylidae. It includes six species, commonly known as beaked geckos, all of which are endemic to the arid zone of the Australian outback.

Members of the genus are terrestrial and nocturnal, sheltering by day in spider burrows. They specialize in eating termites and are most abundant in open, recently burned areas. They can be characterized by their long bodies and narrow heads with enlarged scales at the tip of the snout. Rhynchoedura species are widespread and occupy a range of dry woodland, shrubland, grassland, and desert environments, and none are currently considered to be at risk of extinction.

The genus was traditionally regarded as monotypic, with the single species Rhynchoedura ornata named by Albert Günther in 1867. A second species was described in 1985, though without widespread recognition at the time. In 2011 an extensive revision sampling the population across Australia found overlooked genetic diversity in the genus and named four new cryptic species. Each Rhynchoedura species is native to a specific perennial river drainage, and active rivers during wet periods of the Neogene could have led to allopatric speciation within the genus.

Species

References

 
Lizard genera
Geckos of Australia
Taxa named by Albert Günther